Burning Daylight is a 1920 American silent drama film directed by Edward Sloman with Mitchell Lewis, Helen Ferguson, and William V. Mong starring. It was distributed by Metro Pictures. It is based on the 1910 Jack London novel of the same name.

A subsequent version, Burning Daylight was filmed in 1928 by First National Pictures. It starred Milton Sills and Doris Kenyon.

Cast
Mitchell Lewis as Burning Daylight
Helen Ferguson as Dora
William V. Mong as Necessity
Alfred Allen as Nathaniel Letton
Edward Jobson as Dowsett
Robert Bolder as Guggenhammer
Gertrude Astor as Lucille
Arthur Edmund Carew as Arthur Howison
Newton Hall as Jack
Aaron Edwards as Crandall

Preservation status
A print of Burning Daylight survives in a foreign archive.

References

External links

1920 films
American silent feature films
Films based on works by Jack London
Films directed by Edward Sloman
American black-and-white films
Silent American drama films
1920 drama films
1920s American films